Kelsay is a surname. Notable people with the surname include:

Chad Kelsay (born 1977), American football player
Chris Kelsay (born 1979), American football player
John Kelsay, American academic
John Kelsay (judge) (1819-1899), American politician
Willie Kelsay (1892-1952), American jockey

See also
Kelsay, Indian scout
Kelsey (given name)
 Kelsey (surname)